Asanosuke Matsui (born 18 June 1900, date of death unknown) was a Japanese equestrian. He competed in two events at the 1936 Summer Olympics.

References

1900 births
Year of death missing
Japanese male equestrians
Olympic equestrians of Japan
Equestrians at the 1936 Summer Olympics
Place of birth missing